Sarsfields Galway is a GAA club consisting of the parish of Bullaun, New Inn and Woodlawn in East County Galway, Ireland. Winners of two All-Ireland Senior Club Hurling Championship's.

The club was founded in 1966 and is almost exclusively concerned with the game of hurling. And in 2016 Sarsfields Hurling Club celebrated its 50th year.

Sarsfields Galway were the first club to defend their All-Ireland Club Hurling title. In 1993 Sarsfields defeated opponents Kilmallock, County Limerick in their first All-Ireland club final. In 1994, Sarsfields retained their club title with a victory over Toomevara, County Tipperary.

History
Prior to 1966, two clubs St. Killians (of New Inn), and Bullaun existed in the parish. During 1966 a ruling known as "The Parish Rule" allowed only one club per parish, which forced the decision to amalgamate the two clubs together, thus Sarsfields Galway was affiliated in 1966.
The reason for choosing the name Sarsfields is not precisely known, however, the name is linked to Patrick Sarsfield where verbal history tells that Sarsfield and his Irish Jacobite army passed through the parish while retreating from the Battle of Aughrim in 1691.
The name "Sarsfields" is almost certainly influenced by Thurles Sarsfields who were kingpins of Tipperary, Ireland hurling at that time.

Notable players
Kevin Hynes
Joseph Cooney
Michael Conneely
Joe Cooney
Jimmy Cooney
Pádraig Kelly
Michael 'Hopper' McGrath
Darren Morrissey

All-Ireland medal winners from Sarsfields
This is a list of club players that have won All-Ireland medals with the Club and/or Galway Inter-County senior hurling teams.
List is incomplete

Hurling honours
All-Ireland Senior Club Hurling Championships:  2
1993, 1994.

All-Ireland Junior B Club Hurling Championships:  1
2023

Connacht Senior Club Hurling Championships:  6
1980, 1989, 1992, 1993, 1995, 1997
Galway Senior Club Hurling Championships:  7
1980, 1989, 1992, 1993, 1995, 1997, 2015.
Galway Intermediate Club Hurling Championship:  1
1976.
Galway Junior Club Hurling Championship:  4
Galway Junior A Hurling Championship: 1996
Galway Junior B Hurling Championship: 1985, 2007, 2022 
Galway Junior C Hurling Championship: 1992, 2001, 2019 
Other Galway Club Hurling Championships:
Galway Under-12 Hurling Championship: 1982, 1990, 1999, 2001, 2021 ( 2nd team )
Galway Under-14 Hurling Championship: 1990, 2000, 2001
Galway Under-16 Hurling Championship: 1980, 1990, 2001
Galway Minor B Hurling Championship: 2000
Galway Under-21 A Hurling Championship: 1984,2006,2008
Galway Under-20 A1 Hurling Championship: 2021

Football honours
Galway Junior Club Football Championship:  1
Junior C – North: 2013
Galway Junior C Football Championship: 2013
Galway Club Football League:  1
Division 4B North: 2013

Golfing honours
Annual All-Ireland GAA Golf Challenge  2
2011.
2012.

References

External links
 Official Galway Sarsfields GAA Club website
 Retired Sarsfields GAA Club website
 Official Galway Hurling Board website

Hurling clubs in County Galway
Gaelic games clubs in County Galway
1993 in hurling
1994 in hurling